The year 1883 in archaeology involved some significant events.

Explorations

Excavations
 In Cyprus, the three sanctuaries and the tombs are excavated for the Cyprus Museum.
 In Rome, the Palace of the Vestals (atrium of Vesta), the abode of the virgin priestesses of the goddess, the Vestal Virgins, is excavated in 1883-1884.
 In Athens, Greece, the Olympieion is excavated in 1883-1884 by the British.
 In Wales, at Cae Gwyn Cave, Tremeirchion, Denbighshire, the cave is extensively investigated from 1883-1887 by H. Hicks: artefacts found, mostly just outside the entrance, date to the middle Aurignacian period.
 In Charleston, West Virginia, the Criel Mound, a burial mound for Adena culture chieftains, is excavated in 1883-1884 under the auspices of the Smithsonian Institution's Bureau of Ethnology and the supervision of Col. P.W. Norris.
 At Taplow Court in England, the Taplow burial, a burial mound of a Saxon prince presumed to be Tæppa, is excavated and a number of treasures are discovered.

Discoveries
 "Coba Tumulus" at Sakçagözü by Karl Humann and Felix von Luschan.
 A large Gallo-Roman mosaic pavement at Grand, Vosges.

Publications

Finds
 Ceratosaurus nasicornis (now on display at the Smithsonian) is excavated in 1883, and later named and described by Marsh (March 19, 1884).

Awards

Miscellaneous
 January 1 - Augustus Pitt Rivers takes office as Britain's first Inspector of Ancient Monuments.
 Moses Shapira presents the Shapira Scroll, a continuing source of controversy.

Births
 June 7 - Sylvanus G. Morley, Mayanist. (died 1948)

Deaths

References

Archaeology
Archaeology by year
Archaeology
Archaeology